Suffolk County Council is a local council of the Boy Scouts of America that serves youth in Suffolk County, New York. The council currently has a membership of 11,000 youth and 4,000 adult volunteers.

History
Originally, the Huntington and Smithtown councils were founded in 1917, and both folded in 1918. In 1919, the Patchogue Council was founded, changing its name that same year to the Suffolk County Council (#404).

Organization
The council operates a Council Service Center in Medford. The council is divided into four districts:
 Benjamin Tallmadge District (Northeast)
 Matinecock District (Northwest)
 Sagtikos District  (Southwest)
 Trailblazer District (Southeast)

Camps

Baiting Hollow Scout Camp, which opened in 1926, is a year-round camping facility owned by the council, located in Baiting Hollow, New York. Baiting Hollow Scout Camp is a nearly 300-acre piece of property on the north shore of Long Island along the Long Island Sound. Other than the Long Island Sound, the property holds a large freshwater lake and a brackish marsh. The hilly (or seemingly mountainous) property offers sights of wild animals ranging from deer, to osprey, to wild turkey. While it is easy to wander about the property, it is almost impossible to get lost due to the road accessibility and distance from any of cabins and campsites.

The property offers the following accommodations, some things might be seasonal or weather dependent.
13 campsites. Each site has a permanent flagpole, fire-pit, wooden platforms, sinks (with potable water) with drains. During the summer months these platforms have heavy canvas tents on them and carports in the site's center. The campsites are named Baden Powell North, Baden Powell South, Brownsea, Dan Beard, James E. West, Lower Roanoke, Nathan Hale, Pine Ridge, Pine Tree, Pwamas, Treasure Oaks, and Upper Roanoke.
5 cabins. Each cabin has its own unique charm ranging from lean-to's around it (at Adirondack), newly renovated bathroom (in Penataquit), or wood-burning stoves for heat (in Shinnecock, Boat House, and Tuocs).
Dining hall with commercial grade kitchen, capable of serving upwards of 300 people. This building also has a full PA system, with projectors and screens on either end. The one end also has a newly installed gas-powered fireplace. Perfect for hosting a Blue & Gold, Red & Green, Court of Honor or another Scouting event.
3 training rooms. These rooms can hold between 20 and 100 people, and are all capable of having projectors, flip charts, and white boards.
A freshwater lake. In here Scouts can go swimming, small boat sailing, canoeing, row boating, kayaking, snorkeling, and SCUBA. The swimming end of the lake is also capable of having a floating trampoline and an inflatable floating iceberg slide. *Boats are available for rental and use off of camp property with prior approval.
A 32-foot climbing tower, with three levels of difficulty and a rappelling wall.
A low-C.O.P.E. course with 7 elements of varying difficulty
A high-C.O.P.E. course
An outdoor campfire arena, with seating for 280, outdoor lighting, and electricity.
Rifle range, equipped for night shooting and covered over for inclement weather. BB Guns available for younger Scouts.
Archery range, including a separate area for Mountain Man activities (tomahawk throwing, slingshot shooting) and a Field Course.
Full orienteering course

Order of the Arrow 
The Order of the Arrow is represented by Shinnecock Lodge 360. The lodge was founded on June 20, 1947. The lodge totem is the tern.

See also
Scouting in New York

External links
Suffolk County Council Official Website
Baiting Hollow Scout Camp Official Website
Shinnecock Lodge 360 Official Website

References

Boy Scout councils in New York (state)
1919 establishments in New York (state)
Youth organizations established in 1919
Suffolk County, New York